Anne Looby is an Australian actress, producer and stage director. She is known for playing character roles in TV serials.

Career 

Since graduating from NIDA in 1988, Looby has worked in theatre, television and film. She appeared in the serial A Country Practice as vet Anna "Lacey" Newman and All Saints as Julie Archer and the award-winning ABC mini-series Simone de Beauvoir's Babies.  She was awarded the AFI for Best Actress in a mini-series for this role.

She has appeared in the feature films Daydream Belierghtiver (1992), Willful (2001) and with John Malkovich in Disgrace.

In 2007, Looby was in Company in the role of Joanna. 

She appeared in the play Arcadia, winning the Sydney Critic Award.

Looby directed the stage productions of Hi-5 House Hits for international touring in 2014, followed by Hi-5 House of Dreams touring production in 2015. Between 2012 and 2016, she directed school productions of A Midsummer Night's Dream, Much Ado About Nothing and Twelfth Night. In addition Anne has been assistant director at ACA for the 2012, 2014 productions of Reality Bytes.

Between 2006 and 2011, Looby conceived, developed and produced Breast Wishes.

She has taught acting-for-camera and Shakespeare for Beginners at both the NIDA summer school and Theatre Nepean UWS. She has also been a drama coach for HSC drama students.

Looby was a member of the NIDA Board of Studies for 11 years and is a member of the Actor's Centre Australia Advisory Board and member of the Sydney arts community and has been a member of MEAA for 30 years.

Filmography

References

External links 
 

AACTA Award winners
Australian television actresses
Australian stage actresses
Living people
Year of birth missing (living people)
20th-century Australian actresses
21st-century Australian women
21st-century Australian people